Enzo Deligny (born 17 April 2008) is a French racing driver and member of the Red Bull Junior Team.

Personal life 
Born in Shanghai, China, from a Chinese mother, Yan Sha Deligny, a sister, Elisa Deligny, and a French father, Arnaud Deligny,former racer in the Chinese Volkswagen Polo GTi Cup, which he won in 2013 and 2014, Enzo speaks French, Chinese (Mandarin), and English fluently and has a good knowledge of Italian. As of 2023 he resides in Milan, Italy.

Career

Karting 
At the age of five, Deligny started karting at the track located inside the Shanghai International Circuit. Having moved to Los Angeles in 2015, the Frenchman began to race in American championships, winning the Challenge of the Americas and the SKUSA Spring Nationals four years after the fact, as well as finishing second in the SKUSA SuperNationals in the Mini category. In 2020, Deligny switched over to the European karting scene, managing to end up as the runner-up in the ROK Cup International Final.

In 2021, he started racing for the Parolin Motorsport team, competing in various European series in the OK Junior category, which included the CIK-FIA European Championship. The following year, Deligny remained with Parolin, this time progressing to the OK Senior class. This move yielded immediate success, as the Frenchman would take his first victory at the final round of the WSK Super Master Series. From there, he would impress further, winning races in the WSK Euro Series, finishing second overall, and taking a podium at Zuera in the European Championship, as well as qualifying in third for the season finale at Franciacorta, where he would end up fourth in the standings. Speaking about his final year in karting, Deligny described it as having been "positive", whilst conceding that he "could have been better".

Lower formulae 

Deligny made his single-seater debut in 2023, competing in the F4 Spanish Championship for Campos Racing, with previous year's champion Nikola Tsolov having recommended the team to the Frenchman.

Formula One 

In January 2023 Deligny was announced to be joining the Red Bull Junior Team.

Racing record

Karting career summary

Racing career summary

Complete F4 Spanish Championship results 
(key) (Races in bold indicate pole position) (Races in italics indicate fastest lap)

References

External links 

 Enzo Deligny career summary at DriverDB.com
 Enzo Deligny career summary at KartCom.com

2008 births
Living people
French racing drivers
Chinese racing drivers
Spanish F4 Championship drivers
Campos Racing drivers
Sportspeople from Shanghai
French expatriate sportspeople in the United States
French expatriate sportspeople in Italy
Karting World Championship drivers